Actún Can is a natural cave in the municipality of Flores in Guatemala. The cave entrance is located just south of the town of Santa Elena. The cave is connected to the Jobitzinaj cave.

References 

Caves of Guatemala
Limestone caves
Wild caves